The Embassy of the United States in Tokyo (駐日アメリカ合衆国大使館 Chū Ni~Tsu Amerikagasshūkoku taishikan) represents the United States in Tokyo, Japan.  Along with consulates in Osaka, Nagoya, Sapporo, Fukuoka, and Naha, the Embassy provides assistance to American citizens and residents who live in Japan and issues visas to Japanese nationals, and legal residents in Japan who wish to visit or immigrate to the United States.

The current ambassador is Rahm Emanuel, who assumed office on March 25, 2022.

The current embassy building was designed by César Pelli and Norma Merrick Sklarek, and was completed in 1976. It succeeded the previous embassy building built on the same property in 1931 by Harold Van Buren Magonigle and Antonin Raymond.

The Ambassador's official residence, built together with the then new embassy in 1931, was one of the first buildings specifically built by the US as an Ambassador's residence. It served as the historic meeting place between Emperor Hirohito and General Douglas MacArthur in 1945.

In January 2001, the U.S. Department of State authorized the Residence of the U.S. Ambassador to Japan to be labeled an important cultural asset.

In August 2021, while visiting Japan for the Tokyo Olympics, First Lady Jill Biden dedicated a room in the U.S. ambassador's residence to the late U.S. Sen. Daniel K. Inouye and his wife, Irene.

Location

The embassy is located in the Akasaka neighborhood of Minato, Tokyo, steps away from the Nagatachō district, home of the Japanese legislature and the Prime Minister's residence.  The address is 1-10-5, Akasaka, Minato-ku Post Code: 107-8420.  It is easily accessible via the Tokyo Metro Ginza or Namboku Lines Tameike-Sannō Station and conveniently located close to the Hotel Okura.

History

Previous US missions in Japan
The first American consulate in Japan was opened at the temple of Gyokusen-ji, Shimoda, Shizuoka under Consul General Townsend Harris.  Gyokusen-ji is also the location of a small number of foreign graves dating from as early as 1854 marking the final resting place of US forces personnel that died while serving as part of Commodore Matthew Perry's 'Black Ship' fleet.

Harris negotiated the Treaty of Amity and Commerce between the two countries, which was signed at nearby Ryōsen-ji in 1858.

The United States established its first legation in Tokyo in 1859 under Townsend Harris. This legation was located at Zenpukuji, a Buddhist temple in the Motoazabu neighborhood of southern Tokyo.

In 1875, the legation was moved to a site on the Sumida River near Tsukiji, in an area slated as a district for foreigners outside the employ of the Japanese government; this site is now occupied by the St. Luke's Garden complex.

The legation moved to the current embassy site in 1890.

In January 1906, following Japan's victory in the Russo-Japanese War, Japan and the U.S. mutually elevated their legates to the rank of ambassador. Several European powers did so at the same time, indicating a perception of equality between Japan and the major Western powers.

World War II

The U.S. Embassy was closed shortly following the Pearl Harbor attack on December 7, 1941. Its American employees (including military attaches) were interned on the embassy grounds until June 1942, when they were sent by ship to Portuguese East Africa and handed over for repatriation. Simultaneously, Japanese diplomats who had been in U.S. were handed over for repatriation.

The U.S. Embassy remained closed during the Allied occupation, as the U.S. was the occupying power in Japan. On April 18, 1946, SCAP General Order 18 established the Diplomatic Section as the primary diplomatic representation of the United States during this period, which was staffed by some State Department employees. Following restoration of diplomatic relations under the Treaty of San Francisco, the U.S. Embassy reopened on April 28, 1952. Robert D. Murphy arrived to serve as the American ambassador. The Embassy of Japan in Washington, D.C. also reopened on the same day.

Rent payment issue
The land on which the embassy sits is about 13,000 m2 (3.21 acres), and has been leased from the Japanese government since 1896. In 2005, it was reported that the US government had made no payments for the embassy's premises since 1998 after failing to agree on a renewal of the lease agreement. In 2007, the two governments agreed to renew the lease through 2027, following which the US government paid its unpaid rent. The annual rent for the underlying land was set at 7 million yen for 1998–2007, 10 million yen for 2008–12, and 15 million yen for 2013–27. The very low rent amount for the land is due to the age of the lease agreement, and the fact that it originally contained no escalation or adjustment provisions.

U.S. Consulates in Japan 
 U.S. Consulate General Naha (Urasoe, Okinawa)
 U.S. Consulate General Osaka-Kobe (Osaka, Osaka Prefecture)
 U.S. Consulate General Sapporo (Sapporo, Hokkaido)
 U.S. Consulate Fukuoka (Fukuoka, Fukuoka Prefecture)
 U.S. Consulate Nagoya (Nagoya, Aichi Prefecture)

See also

 United States Ambassador to Japan
 United States Forces Japan

References

External links
  United States Embassy in Tokyo, Japan

Akasaka, Tokyo
Japan–United States relations
Tokyo
United States
Buildings and structures in Minato, Tokyo
Government buildings completed in 1976